Measure 23 (2002) was a legislatively referred state statute that would have created a single-payer health care system to provide health care to every person in the U.S. state of Oregon. The proposal would have merged all the various funding streams—personal and employer taxes, federal health programs, and the state workers' compensation system—into a single financing system. The system would have covered 100% of medically necessary health care costs with no deductibles or cost sharing. Prescription drugs, preventive care, mental health services, long-term care, dental and vision care, and many alternative therapies would have been covered as well.

The measure was rejected by voters in the general election on November 5, 2002.

Results

See also
Oregon Health Plan
Oregon Ballot Measure 50 (2007)
Health care reform in the United States
List of Oregon ballot measures

References

2002 Oregon ballot measures
Healthcare reform in Oregon